The 2012 United States presidential election in Texas took place on November 6, 2012, as part of the 2012 United States presidential election in which all 50 states plus the District of Columbia participated. Texas voters chose 38 electors to represent them in the Electoral College via a popular vote pitting incumbent Democratic President Barack Obama and his running mate, Vice President Joe Biden, against Republican challenger and former Massachusetts Governor Mitt Romney and his running mate, Congressman Paul Ryan.

As one of the largest Republican strongholds in the country, Romney won the Lone Star State with 57.17%, over Obama's 41.38%, a margin of 15.78%. As in past elections, Obama and the Democrats dominated the Rio Grande Valley, winning upwards of 70% or 80% of the vote in most of these counties, with his best performance in Starr County at 86.34% to Romney's 13.02%, a 73.32% margin. Furthermore, he won the major urban centers of Austin, El Paso, Dallas, Houston, and San Antonio, but Republicans were able to overwhelm the urban vote by sweeping the vast rural areas and suburbs of Texas by large margins. Romney also came extremely close to carrying Harris County, home to Houston, which Obama carried by only 0.08%, or 971 votes. In the process, Romney beat George W. Bush's 2004 record of the most votes for a presidential candidate in Texas, a record later surpassed in 2016 by Donald Trump and in 2020 by both Trump and Joe Biden. By receiving 95.86% of the vote in King County, Romney also recorded the highest proportion of any county's vote cast for one candidate since Barry Goldwater received between 95.92 and 96.59% of the vote in seven Mississippi counties in Mississippi in 1964 – although this occurred when African-American majorities in these counties had been almost totally disenfranchised for seven and a half decades.

Texas's 38 electoral votes were Romney's largest electoral prize in the election. The state solidified its Republican identity in the Reagan Era and had not voted for a Democratic presidential nominee since fellow Southerner Jimmy Carter carried it in 1976. The oil industry is the driving factor of the state's economy, with numerous oil companies such as ExxonMobil being based in the state, and consequently the state has rejected the Democratic Party which has increasingly embraced environmentalist policies. In addition, moderate Republicans' popularity among suburban Texans boosted their support. However, although Romney improved on John McCain's 2008 performance, this election solidified the Texan urban areas' move away from the GOP. Dallas and Harris Counties, home to Dallas and Houston, respectively, both of which flipped in 2008, remained blue this year, setting the stage for suburban areas beginning to slip from the Republican Party.

As a result, this is the last time a Republican won Texas by a double-digit margin of victory. Following this election and the loss of the Republican Party's former hold on the vast suburbs of Austin, Dallas–Fort Worth, and Houston, it would become a Republican-leaning state, voting for Donald Trump by only 8.99% in 2016 and 5.58% in 2020.

As of 2020, this is the last election in which Fort Bend County voted for the Republican nominee and the last time Jefferson County voted for the Democratic nominee. This election is also the last time Texas voted to the right of Indiana, Missouri, Iowa, Mississippi, South Carolina, and Montana.

Primaries

Democratic

The 2012 Texas Democratic Primary was held on May 29, 2012. Incumbent Barack Obama, who was running for the nomination without any major opposition, won the primary with 88.18% of the vote, and was awarded all of Texas' 287 delegates to the 2012 Democratic National Convention.

Republican

The Republican primary was held May 29, 2012.

152 delegates were chosen, for a total of 155 delegates to go to the national convention.

The election was originally scheduled to take place on Super Tuesday, March 6.  Due to litigation over the state's redistricting following the 2010 United States Census, it was rescheduled for April 3.  That date also became uncertain and the primary was expected to be held, at the earliest, in late May 2012, with both May 22 and May 29 being proposed. U.S. District Court judge Xavier Rodriguez, one of the three judges overseeing the litigation, had suggested a June 26 date for the election. Finally, on March 1, 2012, the court issued an order setting the date of the primary to May 29, 2012.

General election

Candidate ballot access
 Barack Hussein Obama / Joseph Robinette Biden, Jr., Democratic
 Willard Mitt Romney / Paul Davis Ryan, Republican
 Gary Earl Johnson / James Polin Gray, Libertarian
 Jill Ellen Stein / Cheri Lynn Honkala, Green
Write-in candidate access:
 Virgil Hamlin Goode, Jr. / Jim N. Clymer, Constitution
 Ross Carl Anderson / Luis Javier Rodriguez, Justice
 Andre Nigel Barnett / Ken Cross, Reform

Results

By county

Counties that flipped from Democratic to Republican
 Brewster (largest city: Alpine)
 Kenedy (largest community: Sarita)

By congressional district
Romney won 25 of 36 congressional districts, including one that elected a Democrat.

See also
 United States presidential elections in Texas
 2012 Republican Party presidential debates and forums
 2012 Republican Party presidential primaries
 Results of the 2012 Republican Party presidential primaries
 Texas Republican Party

Notes

References

External links
The Green Papers for Texas
The Green Papers major state elections in chronological order

2012
United States President
Texas